Water and Fire (Persian: Ab va Atash) is a 2001 film by the Iranian director Fereydoun Jeyrani. The film was scripted by Jeyrani and lensed by Mahmoud Kalari. It starred Leila Hatami, Parviz Parastui and Atila Pesiani in the principal roles.

References

Persian-language films
2000 films
2000s crime drama films
Iranian drama films
Films about domestic violence
Films directed by Fereydoun Jeyrani